Jason Roy-Léveillée (born October 1, 1983 in Saint-Quentin, New-Brunswick) is a Canadian actor. He made his film debut with a minor part in Virginie (1996) when he was 13 years old.

Early life
Son of Paul Léveillée and Kendall Roy was raised in Saint-Quentin, New Brunswick. He is of France, Spain and Britain descent. He graduated Sir Wilfrid Laurier School Board, Quebec High School and Université Laval. He is co-founder of Fanatic Film production in collaboration with Marie-Helene Jodoin.

Profile 
Real Name Jason Roy-Léveillée
Birthdate October 1, 1983
Birthplace Saint-Quentin, New Brunswick, Canada
Height 6'3'' (1.91m)

Filmography
1996: Virginie - as Steve Ferron
2001: Ramdam - as Jean-Félix Beaupré
2002: Lance et Compte: La nouvelle génération - as Guy Lambert
2002: Maux d'amour - as Steve-Pierre Lawrence
2004: Lance et Compte: La reconquête - as Guy Lambert
2006: Lance et Compte: La revanche - as Guy Lambert
2007: Taking the Plunge (À vos marques... party!) - as Frédérick Bédard
2007: The Ring (Le Ring) - as Max
2008: Amandine Malabul - as Charlie Martur
2009: Taking the Plunge 2 (À vos marques... Party! 2) - as Frédérick Bédard (filming)
2009: Lance et Compte: Le grand duel - Guy Lambert
2011: La Run - Guillaume

References

External links

1983 births
Acadian people
Canadian male child actors
Canadian male television actors
Living people
Male actors from New Brunswick
People from Restigouche County, New Brunswick